Einar Møbius (6 August 1891 – 22 November 1981) was a Danish gymnast. He competed in the men's artistic individual all-around event at the 1912 Summer Olympics.

References

1891 births
1981 deaths
Danish male artistic gymnasts
Olympic gymnasts of Denmark
Gymnasts at the 1912 Summer Olympics
Sportspeople from Aarhus